The Tuul River or Tula River (in older sources also Tola) is a river in central and northern Mongolia. Sacred to the Mongols, the Tuul is generally called the Hatan Tuul ("Queen Tuul"). The Secret History of the Mongols (1240 AD) frequently mentions a "Black Forest of the Tuul River" where the palace of Ong Khan was located.

The river originates in the Khan Khentii Strictly Protected Area in the Khentii Mountains, in the Erdene sum of Töv aimag.
From there, it travels southwest until it reaches the territory of Ulaanbaatar. Its water runs through the southern part of the capital city of Mongolia, continuing in a western direction in large loops. When it meets the border of Bulgan aimag it turns north, running along that border. After it enters Selenge aimag, it discharges into the Orkhon River near the sum center of Orkhontuul sum.

The Orkhon flows into the Selenge River, which flows into Russia and Lake Baikal. The Tuul River also flows along the Khustain Nuruu National Park. It is typically frozen over from the middle of November through the middle of April. Willow forests grow along the Tuul River, and the river itself is home to endangered species of sturgeon. Currently the river is suffering from pollution, some caused by Ulaanbaatar's central sewage treatment facility, as well as heavy mineral and sedimentation pollution caused by gold mining in the Zaamar area. In addition, the steady influx of people settling near the river may be causing a degradation of water quality.

Descriptions
The French missionary Jean-Francois Gerbillon, who traveled many times through Mongolia, gave a description of the Tuul river in his journal entry dated August 3, 1698:

Monsieur de Bourboulon (Minister of France) also visited the river in 1860:

Orkhon inscriptions states that Once Toquz Oghuz were living on the sides of Tuul River neighbouring to Tatars. Toquz Oghuz migrated from this place to western regions in the 8th century.

See also
List of rivers of Mongolia

External links
UNESCO paper on water usage in Mongolia, including information on the Tuul River
Scientific analysis of Tuul River flows (PDF format)
Report on effects of gold mining on the Tuul River
Investors' report on gold deposits in the Tuul River basin
Photo album of the Tuul River
Report on environmental problems in Hustai National Park and the Tuul River valley

References

Rivers of Mongolia
Ulaanbaatar
Khentii Province
Töv Province
Bulgan Province
Selenge Province